Kenneth Rickards (22 March 1929 – 7 October 2018) was an English footballer who played as an inside forward in the Football League for Darlington, in non-league football for Stockton, and was on the books of Hull City without playing first-team football. He played youth football for teams in his native Middlesbrough, and represented the North Riding of Yorkshire in the English Counties (16–18) League.

References

1929 births
2018 deaths
Footballers from Middlesbrough
English footballers
Association football inside forwards
Hull City A.F.C. players
Darlington F.C. players
Stockton F.C. players
English Football League players